The Violin Concerto No. 2 in G minor, Op. 63, written in 1935 by Sergei Prokofiev, is a work in three movements:

Allegro moderato
Andante assai
Allegro, ben marcato

It was premiered on 1 December 1935 at the Teatro Monumental in Madrid, by the French violinist Robert Soetens and the Madrid Symphony Orchestra conducted by Enrique Fernández Arbós. Prokofiev wrote it after the first performance,   by Soetens and Samuel Dushkin, of his Sonata for Two Violins, which pleased him greatly. Dushkin had recently had a concerto written for him by Igor Stravinsky, so Prokofiev did the same for Soetens. Prokofiev was on a concert tour with Soetens while he was working on the concerto, and later wrote, "the number of places in which I wrote the Concerto shows the kind of nomadic concert-tour life I led then. The main theme of the 1st movement was written in Paris, the first theme of the 2nd movement at Voronezh, the orchestration was finished in Baku and the premiere was given in Madrid."

The Spanish liked the premiere so much that they sent a delegation of musicians to thank Prokofiev afterwards.

The first two British performances of the concerto were again with Soetens: in 1936 under Sir Henry J. Wood, and in 1938, under the composer. Soetens played the work many times, all over the world, concluding with the premiere performance in South Africa in 1972, when he was aged 75 (he continued appearing in public until age 95, and died in 1997, aged 100).

The concerto is more conventional than the composer's early bold compositions. It starts off with a simple violin melody related to traditional Russian folk music. The graceful violin melody flows throughout the entire second movement, and ends with the initial violin theme reappearing in the orchestra's somber lower register, now accompanied by the solo violin. The third movement rondo's theme has a taste of Spain, with the clacking of castanets each time the theme appears.

Apart from the solo violin, the concerto is scored for moderate-sized orchestra including two flutes, two oboes, two clarinets, two bassoons, two horns, two trumpets, snare drum, bass drum, castanets, cymbals, triangle, and strings.

In theater 
 Violin Concerto No. 2, a ballet by Anthon Pimonov, was premiered by the Mariinsky Ballet on 4 July 2016.

References

Further reading

External links
Prokofiev.org page on Concerto
Rochester Philharmonic Concert Notes on the Concerto

Concertos by Sergei Prokofiev
Prokofiev Violin Concerto 2
1935 compositions
Compositions in G minor